Rice Lake is a lake in Hubbard County, in the U.S. state of Minnesota.

Rice Lake was named for the wild rice around the lake.

See also
List of lakes in Minnesota

References

Lakes of Minnesota
Lakes of Hubbard County, Minnesota